Cold Blooded is the 7th studio album by American singer-songwriter and musician Rick James, released on the Gordy Records imprint of Motown Records.  The title track was written with actress Linda Blair in mind, whom James was dating at the time.

Track listing
All tracks composed and arranged by Rick James.

Side A
"U Bring the Freak Out"
"Cold Blooded"
"Ebony Eyes" (featuring Smokey Robinson)
"1, 2, 3 (U, Her and Me)"

Side B
"Doin' It"
"New York Town"
"P.I.M.P. the S.I.M.P." (featuring Grand Master Flash)
"Tell Me (What You Want)" (featuring Billy Dee Williams) 
"Unity"

2014 digital remaster bonus track
  "U Bring the Freak Out" (12" Extended Mix) - 7:53

2014 Complete Motown Albums bonus tracks
 "Cold Blooded" (12" Instrumental) - 5:53
 "U Bring the Freak Out" (12" Extended Mix) - 7:53
 "U Bring the Freak Out" (Instrumental) - 6:53

Personnel
Daniel LeMelle, Rick James - horn arrangements
Johnny Lee - art direction
LaMorris Payne, Levi Ruffin Jr., Rick James, William Rhinehart - backing vocals
Allen McGrier, Rick James - bass
Nate Hughes - bongos
Lino Reyes - congas
Ronald Byrd - production coordinator
Jerry Rainey - cowbell
Tom Flye - engineer
Bill Waldman, Carolyn Blades, Ralph Sutton, Tom Swift - assistant engineer
Greg "Bubbles" Levias, Levi Ruffin Jr., Rick James - keyboards, synthesizer
Tom McDermott - lead guitar   
Lead Vocals, Piano, Drums, Guitar, Timpani – Rick James
Mastered By – Bernie Grundman
Percussion – Lino Reyes, Nate Hughes, Rick James
Photography By – Ron Slenzak
Saxophone – Emilio Castillo, William Rhinehart
Trombone – John Ervin
Trumpet – Cliff Ervin, Greg Adams, LaMorris Payne

Charts

Weekly charts

Year-end charts

Certifications

References

1983 albums
Albums produced by Rick James
Gordy Records albums
Rick James albums